The 2016–17 NEC women's basketball season began with practices in October 2016, followed by the start of the 2016–17 NCAA Division I women's basketball season in November. Conference play started in late December 2016 and concluded in March with the 2017 Northeast Conference women's basketball tournament.

Preseason

Rankings

() first place votes

All-NEC team

Head coaches

Note: Stats shown are before the beginning of the season. All numbers are from time at current school.

Postseason

NEC tournament

  March 2017 Northeast Conference Basketball Tournament.

All games will be played at the venue of the higher seed

NCAA tournament

National Invitational tournament

Women's Basketball Invitational

All-NEC honors and awards
Following the regular season, the conference selected outstanding performers based on a poll of league coaches.

See also
2016–17 Northeast Conference men's basketball season

References

External links
NEC website